The Praid mine is a large salt mine located in central Romania in Harghita County, close to Praid. Praid represents one of the largest salt reserves in Romania having estimated reserves of 50 billion tonnes of NaCl.

References 

Salt mines in Romania